Professor Jonathan Sigmund Shalit  (born 17 April 1962) is a British talent manager and chairman of the InterTalent Rights Group, formerly ROAR Global and Cole Kitchenn. InterTalent represents household names across broadcasting, film, television, theatre, comedy, music, sport, digital, social media and literature.

He is a regular speaker at UK and global entertainment industry events and advises government on the UK's entertainment and creative industries as well as appearing regularly as a media commentator. He is Jewish and a supporter of Israel, attending the West London Synagogue.

Career 
Shalit left the City of London School at the age of 18, working initially as a broker at Lloyd's of London and at then worked at Saatchi & Saatchi before founding his first West End talent management company, Shalit Global, in 1991 In 30 years of talent management he has guided the careers of stars including Charlotte Church, Mel B, Baroness Brady, Kelly Brook, Cher, Dame Joan Collins, Rebecca Ferguson, Katherine Jenkins, Sir Elton John, Vinnie Jones , Kelly Hoppen, Lorraine Kelly, Myleene Klass, N-Dubz, Arlene Phillips, Sir George Martin, the Beatles' producer, Pixie Lott, Sting, Tulisa, Gregg Wallace, Simon Cowell, and the winners of the ITV television talent show Britain's Got Talent. In 1994, he was instrumental in the making of The Glory of Gershwin, Larry Adler's album of George and Ira Gershwin songs.

He has been executive producer in two movies (as of 1 September 2019):Pudsey the Dog: The Movie(2014) (also voiced character "Cyril the Chicken") and The Time of Their Lives (2017).

Litigation 
In 2000, after launching the career of child singing star Charlotte Church with a five-album deal, Shalit was sacked as her manager. He sued over the dismissal and was awarded £2million plus costs at the High Court in London.

Charity 
Shalit is chair of trustees and Chief Barker of Variety, the Children's Charity and a leading figure behind the return to London of the Variety Club Showbusiness Awards in 2022. He is also Chairman of the MOBO Charity Foundation (Music of Black Origin), a Trustee of both ChickenShed (Theatre Changing Lives), Patron of the Royal Television Society and Co-Chairman of the Classic BRITS, and a supporter of Norwood.

Media 
As a regular media commentator on entertainment issues, Shalit appears frequently in broadcast and print. In 2012 he gave evidence to the Leveson Inquiry into the culture, practices and ethics of the British Press. His evidence disputed that given by Charlotte Church claiming that she had been encouraged, more than a decade previously, to perform at Rupert Murdoch's birthday party in exchange for positive media coverage, waiving a £100,000 fee.

Recognition 
Shalit was awarded the OBE in 2014 for services to the entertainment industry. He is also holds an honorary professor, awarded in 2012, and honorary doctorate at Henley Business School of Reading University in recognition of his contribution to the arts, music and broadcasting.

References

External links
 jonathanshalit.com Retrieved 12 April 2015
 
 Debrett's Retrieved 12 April 2015

1962 births
English Jews
Living people
British talent agents
Officers of the Order of the British Empire